Awaken is the debut album by the British gothic doom band The Blood Divine. It was released on Peaceville Records in 1996.  The album continues the concepts Darren White had begun developing in his final EP with Anathema, Pentecost III, through very little reliance on a chorus and occasionally psychedelic progression as evidenced in the intro to "So Serene".

Track listing
"So Serene" – 9:21
"Moonlight Adorns" – 5:16
"Visions (Of a Post-Apocalyptic World): Part 1" – 1:01
"Wilderness" – 4:50
"These Deepest Feelings" – 2:37
"Aureole" – 6:46
"Oceans Rise" – 3:20
"Artemis" – 4:20
"In Crimson Dreams" – 5:49
"Heart of Ebony" – 4:18
"Warm Summer Rain" – 4:29
"I Will Bleed" - 4:25 (bonus track on Limited Edition CD book format)

Credits
Darren White - Vocals
Paul Ryan - Guitars
Benjamin Ryan - Keyboards, Organ, Vocals
Paul Allender - Guitars
Steve Maloney - Bass
William A. 'W.A.S.' Sarginson - Drums
Ruth Wilson- Session vocals

1996 debut albums
The Blood Divine albums